Mixpak Records is a Brooklyn-based independent record label, founded in 2009 by record producer Dre Skull. The label operates across a range of genres, from dancehall to underground club music, experimental electronic, rap and leftfield pop. Mixpak has released music by Vybz Kartel, Popcaan, Palmistry, Murlo, and Jubilee, among others.

History
Mixpak was started by producer and musician Dre Skull in 2009 as a multi-genre label encompassing music from across the world. The label's early years saw releases spanning dancehall, synth pop, UK funky house, punk, and more.

In 2011, following a trip to Jamaica, Mixpak released its first full-length album: Kingston Story by Vybz Kartel, featuring the singles “Yuh Love”, “Go Go Wine”, and “Half on a Baby”. The album reached number seven on the Billboard Reggae Albums chart and received coverage in outlets such as Pitchfork and the New York Times.

Subsequent releases on Mixpak struck a balance between dancehall riddims and releases from emerging electronic and experimental artists such as Jubilee, Dubbel Dutch, and Murlo.

In 2012, Mixpak began working with Vybz Kartel’s then protege Popcaan and subsequently signed him to a multi album deal.

On June 10, 2014, Mixpak released Popcaan’s debut album, Where We Come From. The release entered the Billboard Reggae Chart at number two and spawned the singles “Everything Nice” and “Love Yuh Bad”. The album received critical acclaim across the board and in 2016 “Love Yuh Bad” was sampled by Drake on “Too Good” feat. Rihanna.

In 2016, Mixpak won Red Bull Culture Clash in London, defeating Wiz Khalifa, UKG Allstars and Wiley's Eskimo Dance for the trophy. The surprise victory catapulted Mixpak to greater visibility and led to them being ranked among the top labels of the year by many. They continued to release acclaimed full-length albums by Palmistry, Jubilee, and Gaika as well as EPs by Murlo and Wildlife! Jubilee's album was ranked among the best electronic releases of the year by Billboard and Pitchfork.

Mixpak released Popcaan's second album Forever on July 20, 2018. It was preceded by the singles "Body So Good", "Wine For Me" and "Firm And Strong".

As well as releasing records, Mixpak throws a series of parties in New York City and hosts a monthly show on Red Bull Radio. They have a recording studio complex in Brooklyn, New York.

Discography

Releases

Roster

 Andy Petr
 Beenie Man
 Cory Blaine
 Deva Bratt
 Douster
 Dre Skull
 Dubbel Dutch
 Famous Eno
 Gaika
 Hard Nips
 Jubilee
 Konshens
 Koyote
 Lil Scrappy
 Machel Montano
 MC Buzzz
 Melé
 Mr One Hundred
 Ms. Thing
 Murlo
 Natalie Storm
 Palmistry
 Poirier
 Popcaan
 Psycho Tanbad
 QQ
 Schlachthofbronx
 Sissy Nobby
 Sizzla
 Sticky
 Suku
 Tifa
 Tortur3 T 
 Vybz Kartel
 Warrior One
 Wildlife!

References

External links 
 
 

American independent record labels
Companies based in New York City
Record labels established in 2009